The 2019 Canadian Championship was the twelfth edition of the Canadian Championship, contested from May 15 to September 25, 2019. Montreal Impact won their fourth Canadian Championship title (their tenth Voyageurs Cup) and earned a berth in the 2020 CONCACAF Champions League.

The competition expanded to thirteen teams with the introduction of the seven Canadian Premier League (CPL) clubs, the most in the competition's history. The 2019 tournament also marked the first time that clubs from Manitoba and Nova Scotia were represented in the Canadian Championship, and the return of clubs from Alberta after none participated in 2018.

Cavalry FC's 2–1 aggregate defeat of Vancouver Whitecaps FC in the tournament's third qualifying round marked the first time in the history of the Canadian Championship that an MLS team was defeated by a non-MLS team in a home-and-away series.

Ignacio Piatti was the tournament's top scorer with four goals and won the George Gross Memorial Trophy, while Zachary Brault-Guillard received the inaugural Best Young Canadian Player award for the best Canadian player of the tournament aged 21 or younger.

Format
The format of the competition was changed to include the seven CPL clubs, and consisted of three qualifying rounds before semi-finals and a final. All rounds were played in a two-legged tie format. In the first qualifying round, the League1 Ontario champion Vaughan Azzurri, Première ligue de soccer du Québec champion A.S. Blainville, and four CPL clubs entered the competition. They were joined by the remaining three CPL clubs (given byes due to previously competing or being sanctioned earlier than the other clubs) in the second qualifying round. In the third qualifying round, Ottawa Fury FC and two Major League Soccer teams entered. The previous year's champion, Toronto FC, received a bye to the semi-final.

Distribution

Qualified clubs

Note
 Statistics include previous incarnations of FC Edmonton, Montreal Impact, and Vancouver Whitecaps

Schedule

Bracket

First qualifying round

Summary
The first legs were held on May 15, and the second legs on May 22, 2019.

|}
Notes

Matches

3–3 on aggregate. HFX Wanderers won on away goals.

Cavalry FC won 4–1 on aggregate.

York9 won 1–0 on aggregate.

Second qualifying round

Summary
The first legs were held on June 4 and 5, and the second legs were held on June 11 and 12, 2019.

|}
Notes

Matches

York9 FC won 3–2 on aggregate.

Cavalry FC won 3–2 on aggregate.

HFX Wanderers won 4–1 on aggregate.

Third qualifying round

Summary
The first legs were held on July 10, and the second legs were held on July 24, 2019.

|}

Matches

Ottawa Fury won 5–4 on aggregate.

Montreal Impact won 3–2 on aggregate.

Cavalry FC won 2–1 on aggregate.

Semi-finals

Summary
The first legs were held on August 7, and the second legs were held on August 14, 2019.

|}
Notes

Matches

Toronto FC won 5–0 on aggregate.

Montreal Impact won 3–1 on aggregate.

Final

Summary
The first leg was held on September 18, and the second leg was held on September 25, 2019.The higher-seeded team in the final, Toronto FC, chose to play the first leg away.

|}

Matches

1–1 on aggregate. Montreal Impact won 3–1 on penalties.

Goalscorers

References

External links 
 CBC Sports explanation of the tournament

2019
2019 in Canadian soccer
2019 domestic association football cups